The 1970 Polish Speedway season was the 1970 season of motorcycle speedway in Poland.

Individual

Polish Individual Speedway Championship
The 1970 Individual Speedway Polish Championship final was held on 27 September at Gorzów.

Golden Helmet
The 1970 Golden Golden Helmet organised by the Polish Motor Union (PZM) was the 1970 event for the league's leading riders.

Calendar

Final classification
Note: Result from final score was subtracted with two the weakest events.

Junior Championship
 winner - Stanisław Kasa

Silver Helmet
 winner - Zbigniew Marcinkowski

Team

Team Speedway Polish Championship
The 1970 Team Speedway Polish Championship was the 23rd edition of the Team Polish Championship. 

KS ROW Rybnik won the gold medal. The team included Andrzej Wyglenda, Antoni Woryna, Jerzy Gryt and Stanisław Tkocz.

First League

Second League

References

Poland Individual
Poland Team
Speedway
1970 in Polish speedway